The Bow Valley Crag and Canyon is a weekly local newspaper based in Banff, Alberta, Canada. On July 3, 2013, following the 2013 Alberta floods, Sun Media (now Postmedia) combined the Banff Crag & Canyon and the Canmore Leader under one publication.  The Bow Valley Crag & Canyon is delivered across Banff and Canmore and covers news from Lake Louise to Kananaskis. Like other local newspapers in the Bow Valley, the Crag & Canyon does not charge customers directly but relies solely upon advertising revenue for income.

See also
 Similkameen News Leader
 Pique Newsmagazine
 Canmore Leader
List of newspapers in Canada

References

External links
 Banff Crag & Canyon

Banff, Alberta
Weekly newspapers published in Alberta